This is a list of the governors of the province of Uruzgan, Afghanistan.

Governors of Uruzgan Province

See also
 List of current governors of Afghanistan

References

Urozgan